M9 motorway may refer to:

Baltic Highway, a highway in Russia
M9 motorway (Ireland), a motorway in Ireland
M9 motorway (Scotland), a motorway in Scotland
Super Highway, a motorway in Pakistan